Charles Redmon (February 1900 – September 1, 1944) was an American track and field athlete for the University of Chicago. He won the hammer throw competition at the first NCAA track and field championships in 1921 with a throw of 133 feet, 9-3/4 inches.  He also won the hammer throw in every dual meet for the University of Chicago in 1921. In June 1921, he was selected as the captain of the University of Chicago track team. A native of Peru, Indiana, Redmon was also played football for Amos Alonzo Stagg's Chicago Maroons football team as a guard.

See also
 1921 NCAA Men's Track and Field Championships

References 

1900 births
1944 deaths
American male hammer throwers
Chicago Maroons football players
People from Peru, Indiana
20th-century American people